Nikita Lazovskiy (born 16 August 1999) is a Belarusian professional footballer.

References

External links 
 
 

1999 births
Living people
Belarusian footballers
Belarus youth international footballers
Association football goalkeepers
FC Dinamo Minsk players
FC Oshmyany players
FC Smolevichi players